Chayahuita is an endangered Amazonian language spoken by thousands of native Chayahuita people in the Amazon basin of north-central Peru. Spoken along the banks of the Paranapura, Cahuapanas, Sillay, and Shanusi rivers, it is also known as Chayawita, Shawi, Chawi, Tshaahui, Chayhuita, Chayabita, Shayabit, Balsapuertino, Paranapura, and Cahuapa. There is a 1–5% literacy rate, compared with 5–15% for Spanish, and a dictionary since 1978. It can not be understood by Jebero speakers although there is some overlap in vocabulary, especially some Quechua terms.

Phonology

Vocabulary
Selected Shawi animal names from Rojas-Berscia (2019):

{| class="wikitable sortable"
|+ Selected animal names
! Common name !! Scientific name !! Shawi
|-
| possum || Didelphis marsupialis || anashi
|-
| lowland paca || Cuniculus paca || ipi'
|-
| red squirrel || Sciurus spadiceus || pu'shi
|-
| bicolor porcupine || Coendou bicolor || sese
|-
| common rat || Rattus norvegicus || shumi
|-
| agouti || Dasyprocta punctata || ite'
|-
| capybara || Hydrochoerus hydrochaeris || tucusu'
|-
| pichico monkey || Saguinus fuscicollis || ishi'
|-
| Amazon condor || Sarcoramphus papa || tame
|-
| silver mylossoma || Metynnis argenteus || shite'
|-
| black prochilodus || Prochilodus nigricans || wanki
|-
| armored catfish || Pseudorinelepis genibarbis || warate'
|-
| wolf fish || Hoplias malabaricus || a'nanan
|-
| peccary || Pecari tajacu || kiraman
|-
| jaguar || Panthera onca || ni'ni'
|-
| tapir || Tapirus terrestris || pawara
|-
| giant otter || Pteronura brasiliensis || ini'
|-
| kinkajou || Potos flavus || kuwasha'
|-
| red howler || Alouatta seniculus || nu'nu'
|-
| yellow-tailed woolly monkey || Oreonax flavicauda || sura'
|-
| squirrel monkey || Saimiri sciureus || isen
|-
| bald uakari || Cacajao calvus || tekerenan
|-
| owl monkey || Aotus miconax || kuwi
|-
| spider monkey || Ateles belzebuth || tu'ya
|-
| pink dolphin || Inia geoffrensis || sapana'
|-
| shusupe || Lachesis muta || na'shi
|-
| common lancehead || Bothrops atrox || tayuwan
|-
| boa || Boa constrictor || kupiwan
|-
| wattled curassow || Crax globulosa || i'sa
|-
| bayuca caterpillar || Lonomia obliqua || tiwintata'
|}

References

Languages of Peru
Cahuapanan languages